Paul Genève (30 July 1925 – 3 December 2017) was a French long-distance runner. He competed in the marathon at the 1960 Summer Olympics.

References

1925 births
2017 deaths
Athletes (track and field) at the 1960 Summer Olympics
French male long-distance runners
French male marathon runners
Olympic athletes of France
Sportspeople from Isère
20th-century French people